Louis Paul Pojman (  April 22, 1935 – October 15, 2005) was an American philosopher and professor, whose name is most recognized as the author of dozens of philosophy texts and anthologies, which continue to be used widely for educational purposes, and more than one-hundred papers, which he read at some sixty universities around the world. Pojman was known for his work in applied ethics and philosophy of religion.

Writings
Louis Pojman was the author or editor of 34 books and 100 articles, including: 

 "The Logic of Subjectivity: Kierkegaard's Philosophy of Religion" (1984)
 "Religious Belief and the Will" (1986)
 "The Abortion Controversy" (2nd ed. 1998)
 "Ethics: Discovering Right and Wrong" (7th ed., 2012) [Co-author James Fieser]
 "Global Environmental Ethics" (1999)
 "Life and Death: Grappling with the Moral Dilemmas of Our Time" (2nd ed. 2000)
 "Environmental Ethics: Readings in Theory and Application" (6th ed. 2011) [Co-author Paul Pojman (d. 2012)]
 "The Moral Life: A Reader in Moral Philosophy" (5th ed. 2014) [Co-author Lewis Vaughn]
 "Justice" (2006)
 "Who Are We? Theories of Human Nature" (2006)
 "How Should We Live? An Introduction to Ethics" (2005)
 "Philosophy of Religion" (1998; re-issued in 2009)
 "Philosophy of Religion: An Anthology" (6th ed., 2012) [Co-author Michael Rea]
 "Philosophy: The Quest for Truth" (9th ed. 2014) [Co-author Lewis Vaughn]
 "Philosophy: The Classics" (3rd ed. 2011)  [Co-author Lewis Vaughn] 
 "Terrorism, Human rights, and The Case for World Government" (2006)
 "Egoism and Altruism: A Critique of Ayn Rand" (2016)

See also
 Moral absolutism

References

External links
www.louispojman.com Official website

1935 births
Nyack College alumni
Union Theological Seminary (New York City) alumni
Alumni of the University of Oxford
University of Mississippi faculty
Brigham Young University faculty
University of California, Berkeley faculty
Philosophy academics
American Christian writers
Christian philosophers
2005 deaths
People from Cicero, Illinois
Philosophers of religion
20th-century American philosophers
Kant scholars